{{Infobox concert tour
| concert_tour_name = Edge of Forever Tour
| artist = Lynyrd Skynyrd
| album = Edge of Forever
| start_date = August 29, 1999
| end_date = October 19, 2002
| number_of_shows = 21
| last_tour = Lynyrd Skynyrd Twenty Tour (1997-1998)
| this_tour = Edge of Forever Tour Tour (1999-2002)
| next_tour = Vicious Cycle Tour (2002-2008)
}}Edge of Forever Tour''' was a concert tour by Lynyrd Skynyrd in support of their album, Edge of Forever. The band performed shows with a number of other artists including Ted Nugent and Deep Purple.

Typical setlist
 Workin' For MCA
 That Smell
 Travelin' Man
 You Got That Right
 Gimme Back My Bullets
 Swamp Music
 Call Me the Breeze
 Sweet Home Alabama
 Freebird

Tour dates

Personnel
Gary Rossington – Guitar
Johnny Van Zant – lead vocals
Leon Wilkeson – bass (until his death on July 27, 2001)
Ean Evans - bass (Wilkesons replacement)
Ricky Medlocke – Guitar
Hughie Thomasson – Guitar
Billy Powell – Piano
Kenny Aronoff – drums & percussion

References

External links
Chrome Oxide Skynyrd Set List

1999 concert tours
2000 concert tours
2001 concert tours
2002 concert tours
Lynyrd Skynyrd concert tours